Coin Coin Chapter One: Gens de Couleur Libres is a live in-studio album by jazz saxophonist Matana Roberts. It was the first of their twelve-chapter Coin Coin project. It was released by Constellation Records in 2011.

Critical reception
The album scored a metascore of 84/100 on Metacritic, based on 6 reviews, indicating 'universal acclaim'.

BBC Music greeted the album warmly, writing:
The musical terrain is fast-changing, with moods switching repeatedly. This is an ambitious work, and all of its aims have surely been fulfilled. Roberts is already an artist with multiple facets, deftly accentuated to suit each musical circumstance.

Chris Barton of the Los Angeles Times named the album one of the top ten jazz releases of 2011.

Track listing

Personnel
Matana Roberts: reeds/voice
Gitanjali Jain: voice
David Ryshpan: piano/organ
Nicolas Caloia: cello
Ellwood Epps: trumpet
Brian Lipson: bass trumpet
Fred Bazil: tenor sax
Jason Sharp: baritone sax
Hraïr Hratchian: doudouk
Marie Davidson: violin
Josh Zubot: violin
Lisa Gamble: musical saw
Thierry Amar: bass
Jonah Fortune: bass
David Payant: drums/vibes
Xarah Dion: prepared guitar
Recording/Mixing: Radwan Moumneh
Mastering: Harris Newman

References

2011 albums
Coin Coin 1